Lena Sofia Alexandra Arvidsson (born 16 February 1984) is a Swedish professional padel player and a former tennis player. In her tennis career, she won two singles titles and one doubles title on the WTA Tour, as well as 20 singles and 13 doubles titles on the ITF Circuit. On 1 May 2006, she reached her career-high singles ranking of world No. 29. On 12 September 2011, she peaked at No. 67 in the WTA doubles rankings. Over her career, Arvidsson defeated top-ten players Marion Bartoli, Anna Chakvetadze, Jelena Janković, Petra Kvitová, Sam Stosur, and Caroline Wozniacki.

Career
Arvidsson began playing tennis at the age of eight. In 1999, she combined the ITF Junior and ITF Women's Circuit into her schedule, and in 1999 made the semifinals of a $10k women's event in Båstad. In 2000, she made the final of Nasbypark and had her first appearances in the Fed Cup.

2001
Arvidsson reached the finals of the junior Australian Open, losing to Jelena Janković. Her breakthrough came in the same year when she took titles in Sunderland and Stockholm (both $10k tournaments). She then won her third ITF title in Buchen, Germany. She stepped up her tournament game as she played qualifying at a $50k event in Dinan, where she qualified and defeated the world No. 146 in the main draw.

2002
In May 2002, Arvidsson reached her first $25k final, as a qualifier, eventually losing to Barbora Strýcová. In the same year, she lifted the Bastas $25k trophy in her home country beating fellow Swede Maria Wolfbrandt in the final. Her ranking was now high enough to compete at Grand Slam level in qualifying. Her debut came at the US Open as a qualifier, where she made the final round of qualifying, losing to Brie Rippner. She made two more ITF finals in 2002, winning in Southampton ($25k) and losing in the final in Prague, which was her final event of the year.

2003
Her ranking now 147, Arvidsson began the year in WTA events mainly in qualifying. She failed to qualify in Hobart and the Australian Open, took a step down and played the $50k event in Ortisei, making the final that she lost to Mara Santangelo.

After the beginning of 2003, Arvidsson lost in the opening qualifying rounds of the French Open and Wimbledon. She won her first Grand Slam match at the US Open, beating Olga Blahotová. Two weeks later, she took the $25k Glasgow crown and lost in the final of another $25k tournament in Jersey. She played the WTA event in Luxembourg, again as a qualifier, making the second round before losing to Maria Sharapova. This was her best tournament as it was the first time she had won a WTA main-draw match. She then played the WTA tournament in Quebec City where she made the second round of the main draw.

2005
Arvidsson made the quarterfinals in Tokyo, Kolkata and Stockholm in 2005 before reaching her first WTA Tour final in Quebec City, losing to Amy Frazier.

2006
Arvidsson began 2006 at the Hopman Cup alongside Thomas Johansson, beating the eventual winners in the group stages (USA). She then posted her best Grand Slam result at the Australian Open, beating Dinara Safina in round two before losing to Anastasia Myskina. She won her first WTA title in Memphis, beating Marta Domachowska in the final.

2007
This slump continued in early 2007, before she won a Swedish tour event (Volkswagen Cup) beating Johanna Larsson. After that, she won the doubles and singles at the $50k event in St Paul. Then she returned as the defending champion to Memphis, beating Ekaterina Bychkova and Nicole Pratt on the way to a quarterfinal appearance against Meilen Tu, but lost. Arvidsson lost in the opening round of the Las Vegas $75k and Indian Wells to Michaëlla Krajicek. She qualified for Miami losing in three sets to Olga Puchkova. On clay in Estoril, she made the quarterfinals, losing to Gréta Arn in straight sets. At the end of the 2007 season, she hit back taking the $25k Nantes title in doubles, the $25k Glasgow doubles title and also the championship in singles at the $50k event in Joué-lès-Tours and the $25k event in Glasgow.

2008
Arvidsson started the season in Auckland at the Auckland Open beating Ahsha Rolle in the first round before a straight-sets loss to top seed Vera Zvonareva. She then moved to Sydney, gaining three straight set wins in qualifying by defeating Galina Voskoboeva, Stéphanie Dubois, Tzipora Obziler and in the main draw beat Elena Dementieva, before finally bowing out against Kaia Kanepi in the second round. In her first Grand Slam tournament of the year, Arvidsson made the second round, beating No. 10 seed Marion Bartoli, before losing to Marta Domachowska. She recorded another win in the Fed Cup, beating Patty Schnyder in three sets. She then reached the quarterfinals of the Tier II Proximus Diamond Games, eliminating Meilen Tu, and second seed and world No. 6, Anna Chakvetadze, in straight sets. She eventually lost to Li Na in a high quality match. She reached her second back-to-back quarterfinal in Memphis, after two three-set wins over Séverine Brémond and Stéphanie Dubois, before falling to Shahar Pe'er in a tight three-setter. In the same tournament, she recorded her best career WTA doubles result reaching the semifinals, partnering Melinda Czink. Arvidsson won her 14th ITF singles title in Zagreb, her biggest career title on the surface of clay. A knee injury at Wimbledon interrupted her season, but she returned for the Olympics (reaching round two, losing to Elena Dementieva) and then recorded a first round exit at Forest Hills. She made the second round of the US Open and came close to beating Jelena Janković in a dramatic three-set match. She ended the year playing Swedish team tennis for Helsingsborg. Her team, which included Johanna Larsson, were the champions, remaining undefeated throughout the campaign.

2009
Arvidsson started the year playing three tournaments in Australia, Brisbane, Sydney and the Australian Open. She lost in the first round in all three of these events. She was included in the Swedish Fed Cup team alongside Johanna Larsson, Sandra Roma and Ellen Allgurin. She posted a 2–2 singles win–loss record and 2–1 in doubles. She then headed to the United States. Illness was a factor in her lack of results, as she lost in the first round in all three tournaments, Memphis, Indian Wells and Miami. She recorded her first official win of 2009 on the ITF Circuit in Torhout, beating Kristina Barrois. Arvidsson recorded her second win of the season in Zagreb, though she lost in the second round. Four back-to-back losses followed, including losses in both the French Open and Wimbledon qualifying. At a $25k event in Kristinehamn, she reached the semifinals as the top seed. Arvidsson and Sandra Roma also made the doubles final. She won her 16th career singles title in Saguenay, Canada, and her 11th doubles title at the same event. Arvidsson then posted a semifinal finish in Barnstaple losing to Johanna Larsson, two finals followed in which she played Jelena Dokić in both, with Arvidsson taking the Joué-lès-Tours title and Dokić beating her to claim the title in Poitiers.

2010
Arvidsson began in Auckland qualifying, and was beaten in the opening round by Julia Schruff. Next was the Australian Open qualifying, where, after three tough wins (including saving a match point against Marta Domachowska), she beat Jarmila Groth in the main draw before losing to Daniela Hantuchová. Arvidsson was once again selected to play Fed Cup for Sweden. Her singles success was mixed, losing to Wozniacki and Sevastova, but beating Anikó Kapros and Sybille Bammer. She then made the quarterfinals at the $100,000 tournament in Midland, losing to top seed Lucie Hradecká. As a qualifier and the 2006 champion, Arvidsson reached the finals of the Cellular South Cup in Memphis. She defeated No. 2 seed Melanie Oudin in the quarterfinals and Anne Keothavong in the semifinals to reach the final. She lost in an hour to Maria Sharapova in the final. She made two second round finishes at the U.S. clay tournaments of Ponte Vedra Beach and Charleston. She was involved in Sweden's Fed Cup World Group II Play-off against China, where she beat Zhang Shuai but lost to Peng Shuai. Sweden, however, won the tie. Arvidsson made the finals at two ITF tournaments: in Ystad she was the tournament winner, and in a bigger tournament in The Bronx, she was runner-up to Anna Chakvetadze. She had mixed success on the WTA Tour, but reached two further quarterfinals in the year in Strasbourg and in Memphis.

2011
Arvidsson started her 2011 season at Auckland. She made it to the second round where she lost to eventual champion Gréta Arn. In Hobart at the Hobart International, Arvidsson was defeated in the first round by Australian wildcard Alicia Molik. At the Australian Open, Arvidsson lost her first-round match to ninth seed and eventual finalist Li Na.

2012
During her Fed Cup team competition in February in Eilat, she won three straight singles matches and continued to play well in her favorite WTA tournament in Memphis, where she won the title against Marina Erakovic. She participated in the Olympic Games, losing in the first round in both the singles (to Vera Zvonareva) and the mixed doubles (playing with Robert Lindstedt). She reached the quarterfinals of the Swedish Open in Båstad, losing to Mona Barthel.

2013

Arvidsson began the 2013 season at the Brisbane International. She upset seventh seed Sam Stosur in the first round. She lost in the second round to Sloane Stephens. At the Sydney International, Arvidsson was defeated in the final round of qualifying by Galina Voskoboeva. At the Australian Open, Arvidsson lost in the first round to qualifier Luksika Kumkhum.

After the Australian Open, Arvidsson played in Paris at the WTA indoor event where she was defeated in the first round by Alizé Cornet. During the Fed Cup tie versus Argentina, she lost her first rubber to Florencia Molinero; she won her second rubber when her opponent, Paula Ormaechea, retired due to a torn ligament. In the end, Sweden won the tie over Argentina 3–2. As the defending champion and second seed at the U.S. Indoor Championships, Arvidsson reached the second round where she was defeated by Marina Erakovic in a replay of last year's final. In March, Arvidsson competed in Indian Wells at the Indian Wells Open. She lost in the second round to 21st seed Julia Görges. At the Miami Tennis in Miami, Arvidsson was defeated in the first round by Peng Shuai. Playing for Sweden in the Fed Cup tie against the USA. Arvidsson won her first match over Sloane Stephens. She lost her second match to Serena Williams. The USA ended up winning the tie over Sweden 3–2.

Starting her clay-court season at the Portugal Open, Arvidsson was defeated in the first round by qualifier Galina Voskoboeva. In Madrid, Arvidsson lost her first-round match to Sabine Lisicki. At the Brussels Open, she was defeated in the first round by eighth seed Peng Shuai. Playing in Paris at the French Open, Arvidsson lost in the first round to 32nd seed Sabine Lisicki. After her first-round loss at Roland Garros, Arvidsson moved on to Germany to compete at the first edition of the Nürnberger Versicherungscup. She was defeated in the first round by German wildcard and eventual finalist Andrea Petkovic.

Arvidsson played only one tournament to prepare for Wimbledon which was the Rosmalen Open. She reached the second round where she lost to third seed Carla Suárez Navarro. In London at the Wimbledon Championships, Arvidsson was defeated in the first round by Mirjana Lučić-Baroni.

Playing in her home country at the Swedish Open, Arvidsson lost in the first round to eighth seed, compatriot, and eventual finalist Johanna Larsson.

She participated in two tournaments to get ready for the US Open. Getting past qualifying at the Cincinnati Open, she was defeated in the first round by Alisa Kleybanova. At New Haven, Arvidsson retired during her second-round qualifying match against Monica Puig. Arvidsson won her first Grand Slam match of the year by beating Petra Cetkovská in the first round of the US Open. She lost in the second round to fifth seed Li Na.

Two weeks after the US Open, Arvidsson traveled to Quebec to play at the Challenge Bell. She was defeated in the first round by fifth seed Eugenie Bouchard. In October, Arvidsson competed at the Generali Ladies Linz. She lost in the second round of qualifying to Renata Voráčová. Making it past the qualifying rounds at the Kremlin Cup, she reached the second round where she was defeated by eighth seed Svetlana Kuznetsova. Arvidsson reached the final at the ITF Poitiers in France. She ended up losing in three sets to qualifier Aliaksandra Sasnovich. Arvidsson played her final tournament of the year at the Open de Nantes. Seeded eighth, she was defeated in the first round by eventual finalist Magda Linette.

Arvidsson ended the year ranked 118.

2014

Arvidsson started her 2014 season in Melbourne at the Australian Open. She lost in the first round of qualifying to Renata Voráčová.

2016
On 4 January 2016, Arvidsson announced her retirement from professional tennis.

Performance timelines
Only main-draw results in WTA Tour, Grand Slam tournaments, Fed Cup and Olympic Games are included in win–loss records.

Singles

Doubles

WTA career finals

Singles: 4 (2 titles, 2 runner-ups)

Doubles: 3 (1 title, 2 runner-ups)

ITF Circuit finals

Singles: 32 (20 titles, 12 runner-ups)

Doubles: 16 (13 titles, 3 runner-ups)

Top 10 wins

Notes

References

External links

 
 
 

1984 births
Living people
Sportspeople from Halmstad
Swedish female tennis players
Female tennis players playing padel
Hopman Cup competitors
Tennis players at the 2008 Summer Olympics
Tennis players at the 2012 Summer Olympics
Olympic tennis players of Sweden
Sportspeople from Halland County
20th-century Swedish women
21st-century Swedish women